Eduard Tauwitz (21 January 1812 – 26 July 1894) was a German composer and a native of Glatz, Prussian Silesia.

While studying law at the University of Breslau, he devoted himself to music under the direction of organist Franz Wolf and music director Johann Theodor Mosewius and took charge of the students' choral society. Having decided not to follow a juridical career, he left Breslau in 1837 to direct the orchestra of a theater in Vilnius. In 1840 he went in the same capacity to Riga, but in 1843 returned to Breslau and two years later accepted a similar position in Prague, where he also taught music. After the death of Leopold Zvonař, he succeeded him as the director of the Žofín Academy, a music school for women.

He also composed three operettas: , Bradamante and Trilby.

Tauwitz died on 26 July 1894 in Prague, Austria-Hungary, and was buried in the Olšany Cemetery under a white marble tombstone designed by sculptor Ignác Weinrich.

Notes and references 

1812 births
1894 deaths
19th-century classical composers
German opera composers
Male opera composers
19th-century German Jews
University of Breslau alumni
People from Kłodzko
People from the Province of Silesia
German male classical composers
19th-century German composers
19th-century German male musicians